The Basalt River is a river located in North Queensland, Australia.

The river catchment is mostly used for livestock grazing. The river contains a number of large, permanent, deep and clear waterholes.

See also

References

Rivers of Queensland
North Queensland
Great Dividing Range